Alexander Ivanovich Deubner (15 August 1899 – 15 May 1946) was a Catholic priest after Orthodox one and again priest of the Russian Catholic Church of the Byzantine Rite, member of Russian apostolate and member of Russian diaspora.

Biography
Deubner was born in Ilensko-Tobolsk village, Tobolsk Governorate, Russian Empire, into a family of Catholic priests of the Byzantine rite, Ivan Deubner, his father having converted to Catholicism in 1903. Alexander in 1913 lived in Saint Petersburg, and then he was brought up in a Catholic Assumptionists Order, first in Constantinople, then in Belgium, and later he took his monastic vows in the Order with the name Spyridon. Ordained a priest in Constantinople in 1926 by Bishop Michael Mirov, Exarch of the Bulgarian Greek Catholic Church he was sent to work with Russian immigrants in the south of France, under the leadership of the priest Lev Gillet, OSB, serving in the House for Russian children in Nice. In 1928 Alexander Deubner and Gillet abandoned Catholicism and went to the jurisdiction of the Orthodox Metropolitan Eulogius (Georgievsky) of the Western European Exarchate of Russian Orthodox parishes, but shortly after, at the request of his (Catholic) father suffering exile within Russia, Alexander returned to Catholicism, working in the Commission "Pro Russia" and being secretary of Bishop Michel d'Herbigny.

In 1932 he left the ministry for 'not very honourable' reasons and went to Berlin where he was denounced as a Soviet spy, but in 1933 he returned to Rome, and shortly went to Paris. From 1935 he was living in Prague and in 1943 he was arrested by the Nazi regime and taken to Berlin, where he worked as a translator at the beginning of 1945, returning to Prague on 12 July 1945 where he was arrested and taken to the Soviet Union.

Other
Alexander's sister Nadezhda became a Catholic nun in the Assumptionists Order. Deubner was the nephew of Clara Zetkin of the Communist Party of Germany.

References

External links
Catholic.ru

1899 births
1946 deaths
Converts to Eastern Catholicism from Eastern Orthodoxy
Former Russian Orthodox Christians
Russian Eastern Catholics